Sharpley may refer to:

Evan Sharpley (born 1986), professional baseball player currently in the Seattle Mariners organization
Glen Sharpley (born 1956), retired professional ice hockey player
Jack Sharpley (1906–1968), Australian rules footballer who played with Hawthorn in the VFL
Tracy Denean Sharpley-Whiting (born 1967), feminist scholar and Gertrude Conaway Vanderbilt Distinguished Professor of French in the Vanderbilt University College of Arts and Science
William Sharpley (1891–1916), English soldier and footballer
William H. Sharpley (1854–1928), American politician

See also
Kate Sharpley Library (or KSL) is a library dedicated to anarchist texts and history
Sharpley, Delaware, unincorporated community in New Castle County, Delaware, United States